Mohammad Taha  is a co-founding member of the Palestinian military group Hamas, who was arrested by the IDF in 2003.  On May 5, 2004, after being held 14 months without trial, the 68-year-old Taha was released back to Gaza. His son, Ayman Taha, was a spokesman and former fighter for Hamas in the Gaza Strip.

References

Living people
Hamas members
Palestinian militants
1930s births